The 13th Continental Regiment, also known as Read's Regiment, was raised April 23, 1775, as a Massachusetts militia regiment at Cambridge, Massachusetts, under Joseph Read. The regiment would join the Continental Army in June 1775. The regiment saw action during the Siege of Boston, the New York Campaign and the Battle of Trenton. The regiment was disbanded on January 1, 1777, at Morristown, New Jersey.

Col Timothy Walker Minutemen Regiment-1775

3rd Regiment, Provincial Army April-July 1775

22nd Regiment, Army of the United Colonies July - Dec 1775

13th Regiment, Continental Army -Jan 19 ,1776 

source -https://www.amazon.com/General-Wards-Colonial-Keith-Brough/dp/1517446260

External links 
Bibliography of the Continental Army in Massachusetts compiled by the United States Army Center of Military History

13th Continental Regiment